Daler Singh (born 18 August 1967), better known as Daler Mehndi, is an Indian singer, songwriter, author, and record producer. He has helped to make bhangra popular worldwide, as well as Indian pop music independent of Bollywood music. He is best known for his dance songs, voice, turban, and long, flowing robes.

Early life
Daler Mehndi was born in Patna, Bihar, India into a Sikh family. In 1991, he formed his own group, comprising his brothers, cousins and friends. In 1994, he was awarded the Voice of Asia International Ethnic and Pop Music Contest in 1994 in Almaty, Kazakhstan.

Music career

Magnasound signed Mehndi for a three-album contract for three years. Bolo Ta Ra Ra, Mehndi's debut album, sold over 20 million copies. The album established Daler as a pop star, which also won him the Channel V's Best Indian Male Pop Artist Award. A year later, his second album under Magnasound, Dardi Rab Rab, was launched. This album surpassed the sales of Bolo Ta Ra Ra. He was nominated in three categories at Channel V Music awards and won the Channel V Best Indian Male Artist Award.

In 1997, he released his third album Balle Balle. This got him Channel V Awards in six categories. Like his previous albums, Balle Balle went multi-platinum. The same year, Mehndi composed and performed the popular track "Na Na Na Re" for the Bollywood film Mrityudata, where he featured on the big screen with Amitabh Bachchan. The film's Bollywood soundtrack album sold 1.5million units in India.

The song and video was a success in India, cementing Mehndi's status as India's biggest popstar at the time, later becoming an international success. The album won the award for Best Indian Pop Album at the 1998 Screen Awards.

In 2000, Mehndi released his album Ek Dana with music label TIPS Music. The album had a mix of genres ranging from folk, rock, and pop. One of the more popular songs of the album Sajan Mere Satrangiya featured Indian actress Priyanka Chopra in the video. This video was released in the year that Chopra won the Miss World title. Subsequently, Mehndi signed up with Universal Music in 2001 and released a new track "Kala Kauwa Kaat Khayega". In 2003, Mehndi forayed into playback singing for films. He started with the song "Ru-Ba-Ru" for the film Maqbool. The same year Daler and A.R Rahman came together to give another track "Nach Le" for Lakeer – Forbidden Lines. He fused Rock with Bhangra with his next album titled Mojaan Laen Do and in 2004 he self-produced Shaa Ra Ra.

In March 2014, Deadmau5 and Mehndi made a remix of Mehndi's 1998 hit "Tunak Tunak Tun" performed by the duo.

On Navratri 2014, Mehndi composed and recorded his rendition of the 'Hanuman Chalisa' overnight while working at his studio in Delhi. Daler Mehndi, feeling inspired during the festival of Navratri, composed and record his rendition of the 'Hanuman Chalisa' in the DM Folk Studio.

In September 2014, Mehndi released his song 'Aaja Mere Twitter Te' to encourage users to visit his Twitter account and Facebook page.

On 6 November 2014, Mehndi released his album 'Best of Gurbani' on the occasion of Guru Nanak Jayanti.

Tours
In 1998, Mehndi was signed by Coca-Cola for product endorsement and was featured in 30 concerts across India. He has performed worldwide including the United States, Canada, Australia, New Zealand, the United Kingdom, the United Arab Emirates, South Africa, East Africa, Oman, Kuwait, Bahrain, Malaysia, Pakistan, Hong Kong, Singapore, West Indies, Belgium, and the Netherlands.

On 29 September 2013, Daler performed at the YouFest festival in Spain. He has had an advent with Canadian electronic dance music artist Deadmau5 in a Lamborghini Murciélago LP670-4 SuperVeloce, Daler featured on his tour in India and together they produced an EDM remixed version of "Tunak Tunak Tun".

In August 2014, Mehndi was invited as the guest of honour along with U.S Congressman Pete Sessions for the closing bell ceremony at NASDAQ Stock Exchange at New York, after which he performed at the National Indian American Public Policy Institute Azadi Diwas (NIAPPI) celebrations on the occasion of the 65th Independence Day.

Mehndi delivered his first ever performance in Kuwait on 5 September. Welcomed by a packed audience at the Al Daiya Indoor Stadium, he broke his own record for the longest live performance without a break by performing for four and a half hours non-stop.

The concert organised by the Indian Cultural Society (ICS) has been named 'Bolo Ta Ra Ra Ra' in honour of Daler Mehndi's globally popular track by the same name.

On the eve of Guru Nanak Jayanti, Mehndi was invited to Ulhas Nagar to perform at the world's largest Prabhat Pheri.

In November 2014, Mehndi visited Mandsaur, Madhya Pradesh for a performance.

In November 2014, Mehndi was invited to Nigeria for a performance to celebrate Diwali. This was the second time the musician has performed in the country.

Artistry 
Mehndi is credited for creating a genre called "Rabbabi", a combination of Thumri, Sufi, and rock and creating an instrument called "Swar Mandir" that combines influences from the Rabab, Swarmandal, and Tanpura. The instrument was crafted by Sanjay Rikhi Ram from Delhi and was launched on 10 February 2012 by the Indian classical music maestro, Bharat Ratna awardee Pandit Ravi Shankar.

Business ventures
Mehndi launched his maiden Record Label 'DRecords' in the year 2000. The record label has several artists under its banner including Hussain Baksh and Safri Boys.

Foreign pop culture
Mehndi's "Tunak Tunak Tun" has found popularity on the internet as a viral video, with the official YouTube video gaining over 200 million views as of November 2022. The video game company Blizzard Entertainment incorporated the Tunak Tunak Tun dance as a character animation in their multiplayer role playing game World of Warcraft. This dance is also included as an easter egg in the video game Medal of Honor: Allied Assault: Spearhead.

Political career
He entered in politics by joining Bharatiya Janata Party on 26 April 2019.

Personal life

Family life
Mehndi is the brother of singers Mika Singh and Shamsher Singh. Mehndi is married to Taranpreet Kaur. He has four children – Gurdeep Mehndi, Ajit Kaur Mehndi, Prabhjot Kaur Mehndi, and Rabaab Kaur Mehndi. His daughter Ajit Kaur Mehndi is married to Navraj Hans, son of Punjabi singer Hans Raj Hans. Gurdeep Mehndi got engaged to his fellow actress from Delhi 1984, Jessica Singh in 2014.

Philanthropy

Daler Mehndi Green Drive
In 1998, Mehndi launched the "Daler Mehndi Green Drive", inducted in the Special Task Force of the Delhi Government. The drive has planted over 1.2 million saplings in and around Delhi.

Charitable causes
Mehndi has performed for charity for Imran Khan's Shaukat Khanum Memorial Trust in Pakistan and helped raise $5 million. Mehndi supports charitable causes such as cancer, thalassemia, and AIDS, and has helped to bring up the homeless children of Kenya as well as famine-stricken families in Kalahandi in Orissa, India. He financially supported the families of Kargil martyrs by donating to the Indian government's Kargil Victims' Relief Fund.
Mehndi was one of the first celebrities to go and visit the soldiers at Kargil. Mehndi has constructed earthquake resistant houses for the Gujarat earthquake victims; he donated money and performed to raise money for Gujarat cyclone and quake victims, and for police welfare funds. He has donated 10 million in Vadodra for the victims of the cyclone in the government aid fund. He took upon himself the reconstruction of a block devastated in the Gujarat quake in Doodhiya village.
 
Mehndi has set up a Daler Mehndi Food for Life Society in Chander Vihar, Delhi, where a 24-hour kitchen provides food to the destitute and the underprivileged. Mehndi has constructed a Gurudwara Dukh Bhanjani Sahib where every morning people from all castes and religions join together and offer service in the name of god. Mehndi is the only known Indian artist to be invited by the President of Pakistan as a state guest. He gifted his album Bismillah to the President Zardari of Pakistan and the funds generated from its sale were given to the President's charitable fund.

Mehndi voiced his protest against International Basketball Federation's (FIBA) controversial ruling on the use of turbans while playing. The singer made a video to raise awareness about the issue and to have the policy changed.

Criminal charges
Mehndi and six others were accused in 2003 of cheating people of large sums of money by falsely promising to take them to America. In March 2018, Mehndi was sentenced to two years in prison by Patiala court in a human trafficking case. The singer and his brother Shamsher were charged for illegally sending people abroad as a part of their dance troupes. Daler was arrested after registration of the case and released on bail after a few days. Mehndi said he will appeal against the conviction in a higher court.

The Patiala court dismissed his appeal in 2022 and upheld the two year imprisonment.

Discography

 "No1 Bhapa Bhape da rabb rakha"
 Bolo Ta Ra Ra.. – 1995
 Dardi Rab Rab – 1996
 Ho Jayegi Balle Balle –  1997
 The Best of Daler Mehndi – album, 1998
 Tunak Tunak Tun – 1998
 Ek Dana – 2000
 Nabi Buba Nabi – 2001
 Lehriya – 2001
 Nach Ni Shaam Kaure – 2002
 Mojaan Laen Do –  2003
 Shaa Ra Ra Ra – 2004
 Destiny – 2005
 Raula Pai Gaya –  2007
 Eh Lai 100 Rupaiya, 2008
 Shamla Meri Koko, 2008
 Jugni, 2008
Jorsey, 2009
 Tunak Tunak Tumba, 2011
 Bhalo Bhalo re Kirtaniya, 2011
 Japji Sahib The Libreation Chant, 2011
 300 Saal Guru De Naal, 2012
 Sai Da Malang, 2012
 Maula Sai, 2012
 Bismillah, 2012
 Rajan Ke Raja, 2012
 Sardaar, 2013
 Allah Hu, 2013
 Dukh Banjni Sahib, 2013
 The Ultimate Truth Mool Mantra, 2013
 Ik Ardaas Bhaat Kirat KI, 2013
 Ik Fakir Vadda Mastana, 2013
 Mere Raam Mere Raam, 2013
 India India, Patriot music album, 2013
 Cricket Nahi Yeh Tamasha Hai, 2013
 Bhaag The Success Anthem, 2013
 Namoh Namoh, 2013
 Aaja Mere Twitter Te, 2014
 Sona Roop Hai Peeli Peeli Sarson, 2014
 Stop The Flight, 2014
 Asi Tan Jithe, 2014
 Dilruba, 2014
 Baani Dasam Granth, 2014
 Best of Gurbani, 2014
 Radha Raman Hari Bol, 2014
 Bhaag Khilad Bhaag, 2014
 Party Punjabi, 2015
 Sabhae Jee Samal, 2015
 Safai Ki Dhun, 2015
 Salla Vella Funda, 2015
 Sohniye, 2015
 Sabhae Jee Samal, 2015
 Maa Padmavati, 2015
 Om Mani Padme Hum, 2015
 Khalsa, 2015
 Baba Nanak Mere Naal Naal, 2015
 Hori Khelungi Baba Bullehshah, 2016
 Salok Mahalla 9 Jo Sukh Ko Chaahai Sadaa, 2016
 350 Saal Sache Patshah Naal, 2016
 Japji Sahib-with Church Organ, 2016
 Saahore Baahubali, 2017

 Reddy Ikkada Soodu, 2018

Filmography

 Mrityudatta – Na Na Na Na Na Re, 1997
 Arjun Pandit – Kudiyan Shehar Diyan, 1999
 Khauff – Ankh Ladti Hai, 2000
 Maqbool – Ru Ba Ru, 2003
 Chupke Se – Kajrare Kajrare Naino Wale, 2003
 Bullet Ek Dhmaka – Ishq Aasaan Hai, 2003
 Lakeer – Nach Le, 2003
 Wajah – Agar Zindagi Se, 2004
 Ramji London Waley – Bhool Na Jaying, 2005
 Rang De Basanti – Rang De Basanti, 2006
 Shadi Se Pehle – Tuteya Ve Tuteya, 2006
 Chodo Na Yaar – Talwar Re, 2007
 Hanuman Returns – Aasma Ko Chukar, 2007
 Goal – Halla Bol, 2007
 Just Married  – Doha, 2007
 Kafila  – Hum Raks, 2007
 No Smoking  – Kash Laga, 2007
 Yamadonga – Rabbaru Gajulu Rabbaru Gajulu, 2007
 Singh Is King – Bhootni Ke, 2008
 Ghatothkach – Maya Bazaar, 2008
 Sunday – Loot Liya, 2008
 Victory – Balla Utha Chhakka Laga, 2008
 Mr. Black Mr. White – Tu Makke Di Roti Meri, 2008
 Money Hai To Honey Hai – Rangeeli Raat, 2008
 Kuselan – Om Zaarare, 2008
 Kathanayakudu - Om Zaarare, 2008
 Hello – karle Baby Dance Wance, 2008
 Dhoom Dhadaka – Dhoom Dhadaka, 2008
 Kissan – Mere Desh Ki Dharti, 2009
 Ek Se Bure Do – Ishq Ke Zaat, 2009
 Magadheera – Chapana Chaptu, 2009
 Lahore – Musafir, 2010
 Dulha Mil Gaya – Dulha Mil Gaya, 2010
 Khatta Meetha – Aila Re Aila, 2010
 Action Replayy – Zor Ka Jhatka, 2010
 Yamla Pagla Deewana – Chamki Jawani, 2011
 Teen Thay Bhai – Teen Thay Bhai, 2011
 Dear Friend Hitler – Hara Shwet Kesariya, 2011
 Miley Naa Miley Hum – Katto Gilheri, 2011
 Rascal – Tik Tuk, 2011
 Love Kiya Aur Lag Gayi – Love Kiya Aur Lag Gayi, 2011
 I Am Singh – 2 songs: Dukalaang Praanasi and I Am Singh, 2011
 Life Ki Toh Lag Gayi – Haryana Ka Sher, 2012
 Srimannarayana – Chalaaki Choopultho, 2012
 Joker – Sing Raja, 2012
 Chaalis Chauraasi – Badmast, 2012
 Kyaa Super Kool Hain Hum – Hum Toh Hain Cappucino, 2012
 Sarsa – UNRELEASED, 2012
 Baadshah – Banti Poola Janki, 2013
 Commando – Lena Dena, 2013
 Sardaar – Ruk Ja Tham Ja, 2013
 Bhaag Milkha Bhaag – Gurbani, 2013
 War Chhod Na Yaar – Phat Gaya, 2013
 Besharam – Chal Hand Utha Ke Nach Le, 2013
 Namo Boothatma – Paisa Paisa, 2014
 47 to 84 – Beriyane Teriyane, 2014
 Yamaleela 2 – O Thayaru, 2014
 Janiva – Moriya Moriya, 2014
 Goreyan Nu Daffa Karo – Dishkayon, 2014
 Kabab Mein Haddi – Kabab Mein Haddi, 2014
 Yoddha – Yoddha, 2014
 ABCD 2 – Vande Mataram, 2015
 A Flying Jatt – Raj Karega Khalsa, 2016
 Mirzya – Title song, 2016
 Saadey CM Saab – Dharti De Puttar Hain Ge Gabhru, 2016
 Dangal – Title song, 2016
 Baahubali 2: The Conclusion- Saahore Baahubali; Jiyo Re Bahubali, 2017
 Poster Boys – Kudiyan Shehar Diyan, 2017
 Paisa Vasool – Paisa Vasool, 2017
 Harjeeta – Dekhi Ja, 2018
 Soorma – Flicker Singh, 2018
 Gold – Title song, 2018
 Aravinda Sametha Veera Raghava – Reddy Ikkada Soodu, 2018
 Kaashi in Search of Ganga – Title Song, 2018
 Uri: The Surgical Strike – Jagga Jiteya, 2019
 Chhalaang - Le Chhalaang, 2020
 Hum Do Hamare Do - "Raula Pae Gayaa", 2021
 Atrangi Re - "Garda", 2021

References

External links
 
 

1967 births
Living people
20th-century Indian singers
21st-century Indian singers
Bhangra (music) musicians
Indian male singers
Indian male singer-songwriters
Indian philanthropists
Indian record producers
Indian Sikhs
Musicians from Patna
Performers of Sikh music
Singers from Bihar
Prisoners and detainees of India